Daveiss may refer to:

 Maria T. Daviess (1814–1896), American author
 Maria Thompson Daviess (1872–1924), American artist, author
 Hannah Daviess Pittman (1840–1919), American journalist; author of the first American comic opera

See also
 Joseph Hamilton Daveiss